This is a list of Minnesota National Guard Units.

Minnesota Army National Guard Units

Joint Force Headquarters and Headquarters Detachment

Medical Detachment
Recruiting and Retention Battalion
Training Support Unit
175th Regiment (Regional Training Institute)
 1st Battalion (Officer Candidate School)
 2nd Battalion (Modular Training)
 Regional Training Site-Maintenance

U.S. 34th Infantry Division
                    
Division Headquarters and Headquarters Battalion
34th Infantry Division Band
1st Armored Brigade Combat Team, 34th Infantry Division
Headquarters and Headquarters Company
1st Battalion, 125th Field Artillery Regiment
134th Brigade Support Battalion
334th Brigade Engineer Battalion
1st Battalion (Combined Arms), 194th Armor Regiment
2d Battalion (Combined Arms), 136th Infantry Regiment
1st Squadron, 94th Cavalry Regiment
2d Battalion, 135th Infantry Regiment
Combat Aviation Brigade, 34th Infantry Division (34th Expeditionary Combat Aviation Brigade)
Headquarters and Headquarters Company
2nd Battalion (Assault Helicopter), 147th Aviation Regiment
Company B, 2nd Battalion (General Support), 211th Aviation Regiment
Company C, 2nd Battalion (General Support), 211th Aviation Regiment
834th Aviation Support Battalion

84th Troop Command

Headquarters and Headquarters Company
1st Battalion, 151st Field Artillery Regiment
Battery E, 151st Field Artillery Regiment
434th Chemical Company
34th Military Police Company
257th Military Police Company
55th Civil Support Team
682d Engineer Battalion
849th Engineer Company (Mobility Augmentation)
850th Engineer Company (Horizontal)
851st Engineer Company (Vertical)

347th Regional Support Group

Headquarters and Headquarters Detachment
114th Transportation Company
147th Human Resources Company
147th Finance Detachment
204th Medical Company (Area Support)
224th Transportation Company
247th Finance Detachment

Minnesota Air National Guard Units

133rd Airlift Wing

Headquarters Group
Maintenance Group
Maintenance Operations Flight
Maintenance Squadron
Aircraft Maintenance Squadron
Medical Group
Medical Support
Medical Operations
Aerospace Medicine
Dental
Mission Support Group
Civil Engineering Squadron
Mission Support Flight
Communications Flight
Security Forces Squadron
Services Flight
Logistics Readiness Squadron
Aerial Port Squadron
210th Engineer Installation Squadron
Operations Group
Operations Support Flight
109th Airlift Squadron
109th Aeromedical Evacuation Squadron
Airlift Control Flight
208th Weather Flight

148th Fighter Wing

Wing Headquarters Group
Antiterrorism
Command Post
Chaplain Section
Financial Management
Inspector General
Judge Advocate General
Military Equal Opportunity
Public Affairs
Wing Safety
Maintenance Group
Maintenance HQ Group Staff
Aircraft Maintenance Squadron
Maintenance Squadron
Maintenance Operations Flight
Medical Group
Bio Environmental
Environmental Management Office
Medical Administration
Nursing Services
Public Health
Mission Support Group
Civil Engineering Squadron
Communications Squadron
Disaster Preparedness
Logistics Readiness Squadron
Military Personnel Flight
Security Forces Squadron
Services Flight
Operations Group
179th Fighter Squadron
Operations Support Flight
Intelligence
Life Support

See also
Minnesota Army National Guard

References

Minnesota National Guard